The Open Richly Annotated Cuneiform Corpus, or Oracc, is an ongoing project designed to make the corpus of cuneiform compositions from the ancient Near East available online and accessible to users.  The project, created by Steve Tinney of the University of Pennsylvania, incorporates a number of sub-projects, including online publications of lemmatized texts in different genres, as well as extensive annotations and other tools for studying and learning about the ancient Near East.  The sub-projects are directed by individual scholars specializing in the relevant topic.  The overall project is led by a steering committee of Tinney, Eleanor Robson of Cambridge University, and Niek Veldhuis of the University of California, Berkeley.

Projects
Oracc currently includes several different kinds of projects.  Some gather and present historical information for studying certain areas of ancient Near Eastern life or scholarship, including projects designed to contextualize specific textual corpora ("portals").  Others provide interfaces for searching corpora.  These usually incorporate full transliterations and translations of texts in a given corpus, and many offer supplementary material such as an introduction to the corpus, discussion of its historical context, and interpretive syntheses of its content.  A few other projects serve as research tools for Assyriological studies (dictionary, sign list).

Historical and cultural background

Textual corpora

Other projects

References

External links

Oracc full text search

Cuneiform
Assyriology